Robert Peters sometimes credited as Roberts O. Peters is a Nigerian film producer, director, cinematographer, actor, and occasional voice-over artist. He is best known for directing the 2014 Nollywood breakout movie 30 Days in Atlanta, as well as the movies Shades of Attractions (2015), Boxing Day (2016) and A trip to Jamaica (2016) which featured: Ayo Makun, Ramsey Nouah, Richard Mofe Damijo, Vivica Fox, Dan Davies,  Lynn Whitfield, Eric Anthony Roberts, Paul Campbell, Funke Akindele, Karlie Redd, Nse Ikpe-Etim, Desmond Elliott, Rasaaq Adoti, and Chet Anekwe amongst others.

Early life
Peters was born in Sabon Gari, Kaduna, Northern Nigeria and is the second of eight children. His parents are Lawrence Adagba and Comfort Peters. He is of Afemai descent and hails from Ososo in the Akoko Edo local government area of Edo State.
 
Peters began his formal education at St. Gregory Primary School in Kaduna. He attended the University of Jos Nigeria, where he studied Geology and Mining.

Career
Peters began his career as an actor in Nigeria in the 1998 movie Mama Sunday, and went on to play the role of Paul in 2002 in the daytime series Everyday People created by Tajudeen Adepetu. In 2004 he relocated to the US, where he enrolled for a certificate degree in Visual Storytelling hosted by New York University. Peters was then associated with Film Career Connection in Atlanta, which offered him on-the-job training on various film sets across the US. He also enlisted with REDucation a real world training on Red camera and equipment, taught by working professionals, for current and future working professionals.

Peters began working as a cinematographer and film editor in 2006 and worked on a number of African-American Productions. In the space of 10 years, he worked with a number of Hollywood and Nollywood filmmakers including: Vivica A. Fox, Lynn Witfield, Eric Roberts, Karlie Redd, Paul Cambell, Richard Mofe-Damijo, Neville Sajere, Ayo Makun, Ramsey Nuoah, Desmond Elliott, Majid Michel, Jim Iyke, Chris Attoh, Funke Akindele, Oc Ukeje, Jeta Amata, Van Vicker, Nse Ikpe Etim, Lisa Raye McCoy, Mercy Johnson, Stella Damasus, James Michael Costello, Sulehk Sunman,  Yvonne Okoro, Carl Anthony Payne, Joseph Benjamin and Tangi Miller.

In 2014, it was reported that the comedy film, 30 Days in Atlanta, directed by Peters, was the highest-grossing film of all time at the Nigerian box office. The movie was also featured in the 2017 Guinness Book of Records as one of the films with the highest domestic gross in the territories of Bollywood, Nollywood and Hollywood, listed alongside PK (from Bollywood) and Star Wars: The Force Awakens (from Hollywood).

Personal life
Peters is married to Deborah Peters and they have a son Zachary Lawrence Onafa-Orafa Peters. They own and run Whitestone Pictures LLC, a film production studio and equipment provider based in Lawrenceville, Georgia.

Awards and recognition

Filmography

Feature Films

See also
 List of Nigerian film producers

References

Nigerian male film actors
Living people
Nigerian film directors
Nigerian film producers
University of Jos alumni
People from Kaduna State
1973 births
Nigerian cinematographers
Actors from Edo State
Nigerian film award winners